Ronald Charles Andrew Hines (20 June 1929 – 28 March 2017) was a British television actor. He had a lengthy career, but possibly his most prominent roles were as Henry Corner in three of the four series of Not in Front of the Children, and as William Cecil in Elizabeth R.

After graduating from RADA in 1950, Hines started on stage at Stratford, and made many theatrical appearances throughout his career, including at the Royal Court, the Old Vic and the National Theatre.

On television, he starred in the 1959–60 sitcom Tell It to the Marines. In 1966, Hines played Eric Redman in the 11th episode of the 5th series of the popular British action adventure The Saint (episode entitled "Paper Chase"). He also appeared on Jackanory several times, usually narrating stories about the Wombles.

Hines appeared as John Copeland in the crime drama series The Professionals (episode "The Acorn Syndrome") in 1980. In 1988 he played Home Secretary Henry Matthews in the TV film Jack the Ripper, which starred Michael Caine. He portrayed Hoofd Commissaris Samson in Thames Television's Amsterdam-set detective series Van der Valk (1991–92).

He also appeared in a number of films, starting with Dunkirk, in 1958 and finishing with Rough Cut, in 1980. All his subsequent screen roles were on television rather than in films.

Hines died in Midhurst, West Sussex, England, on 28 March 2017, at the age of 87.

Select filmography

References

External links

Ronald Hines's Allmovie profile

1929 births
2017 deaths
British male television actors
Alumni of RADA